Maharaja Jashwant Singh (1851-1893) was the  ruler of the princely state of Bharatpur from 1853 to 1893 in Rajasthan, India. His successor was Maharaja Ram Singh.

Early life
Jaswant Singh was born at Deeg on 1 March 1851. He was the only son of Maharaja Balwant Singh. He was educated privately. He had knowledge of the Hindi, English and Persian languages.

Ascended the throne
Jaswant Singh succeeded on the death of his father on 21 March 1853. He ascended the gaddi (throne) on 8 July 1853, reigning under a Council of Regency until he came of age. He assumed limited ruling powers on 10 June 1869 and was invested with full ruling powers on 28 March 1872.

Death and succession
He died at the Deeg Palace on 12 December 1893, having had issue, four sons and three daughters. His successor was Maharaja Ram Singh.

Name and titles
His official full name and title was: His Highness Shri Yadukul Maharaja Jaswant Singh, 11th Maharaja of Bharatpur, GCSI.

External links
Jashwant Singh at Durbar

 

Rulers of Bharatpur state
Knights Grand Commander of the Order of the Star of India
1851 births
1893 deaths
Jat rulers
Jat